The Fremantle Print Award is Australia's longest-running, most prestigious and largest printmaking award, and is awarded by the Fremantle Arts Centre, who also acquire the winning work. The award was established in 1976 with the support of Shell Australia. This partnership continued until 2006.

With acquisitive and non-acquisitive awards the prize money totals  , with $16,000 for the first place, and $6,000 for second. The awards were put on hiatus for 2020, due to COVID-19. Beginning in 2022, the awards will be held every two years.

Several noted Australian artists have been recipients of the award including David Rose in 1978 and Mike Parr in 1990.

Selected past winners include:

 1976 Ray Beattie
 1977 Jock Clutterbuck
 1978 David Rose
 1979 Basil Hadley
 1980 Jörg Schmeisser joint with Rod Ewins
 1981 Paul King joint with Richard Hook
 1982 Ray Arnold joint with Tony Pankiw
 1983 Keith Cowlam joint with Michael Taylor
 1984 Stewart Merrett joint with Monica Schmid
 1985 Alun Leach-Jones
 1986 John Spooner joint with Ruth Johnstone
 1987 Karen Turnbull joint with Margaret Sulikowski
 1988 Daniel Moynihan joint with Ron McBurnie
 1989 Helen Ling joint with Megan Russell
 1990 Mike Parr
 1991 Jock Clutterbuck joint with Jodi Heffernan
 1992 Heather Hesterman
 1993 Bevan Honey joint with Sally Morgan
 1994 Dean Bowen
 1995 Jan Davis
 1996 Paul Brown
 1997 Pat Brassington,
 1998 Kathy Barber
 1999 Raymond Arnold
 2000 Bede Tungatalum joint winner with Chips Mackinolty, Therese Ritchie
 2001 Marion Manifold
 2001 Alick Tipoti, Non-Acquisitive Prize
 2002 Poppy van Oorde-Grainger
 2003 Antonietta Covino-Beehre
 2004 Peter Burgess
 2006 Neil Emmerson
 2007 Tony Ameneiro
 2008  Alick Tipoti, Non-Acquisitive Prize 
 2010 Rebecca Beardmore
 2011 Peter Burgess
 2012 Lucas Ihlein & Ian Milliss
 2013 Alex Maciver
 2014 Gosia Wlodarczak
 2015 Fiona MacDonald, Narelle Jubelin, Maria Madeira and Victor De Sousa
 2016 Sam Bloor
2017 Evan Pank
2018 Deanna Hitti
2019 Rew Hanks
2021 Alison Kennedy, 2nd prize John Prince Siddon

References

Australian printmakers
Australian art awards